Sandarbha (Kannada: ಸಂದರ್ಭ; English: Opportunity) is a 1978 black and white Kannada film written, directed, and produced by Gauri Sundar. The film stars Bharathi, Anant Nag, and Gemini Ganesan, with a guest appearance by Vishnuvardhan. It was the only Kannada film which Gemini Ganesan starred.

Plot

Cast

 Bharathi
 Gemini Ganesan
 Anant Nag
 Vishnuvardhan in Guest app.

References

1978 films
1970s Kannada-language films
Films scored by S. P. Balasubrahmanyam
Indian black-and-white films
Films based on Indian novels